
Gmina Moszczenica is a rural gmina (administrative district) in Gorlice County, Lesser Poland Voivodeship, in southern Poland. The gmina also includes the village of Staszkówka.

Neighbouring gminas
Gmina Moszczenica is bordered by the gminas of Biecz, Ciężkowice, Gorlice, Łużna and Rzepiennik Strzyżewski.

References
Polish official population figures 2006

Moszczenica
Gmina Moszczenica